Under the Crescent is a 1915 American drama film serial directed by Burton L. King, starring Ola Humphrey, and released by Universal. The film is considered to be lost.

Plot
A series of six episodes involving the adventures of an American actress in modern Egypt (circa 1910s). The story is biographical; it was based on the real life of its lead actress, Ola Humphrey, who in 1911 married Egyptian Prince Ibrahim Hassan, cousin of the Khedive.

Cast
 Ola Humphrey - The American Actress
 William C. Dowlan - Stanley Clyde
 Edward Sloman - Prince Ibrahim Tousson
Helen Wright - Princess Ousson
 Carmen Phillips - Princess Uarda
 William Quinn - Said Pasha
 Henry Canfield - Sir Godfrey (as H.E. Canfield)
 Orral Humphrey - Meheimit Ali
 Edna Maison - Princess Zohna

Chapter titles
 The Purple Iris
 The Cage of the Golden Bars
 In The Shadows of the Pyramids
 For The Honor of a Woman
 In The Name of the King
 The Crown of Death

See also
 List of film serials
 List of film serials by studio
 List of lost films

References

External links

Under the Crescent at SilentEra

1915 films
1915 drama films
1915 lost films
American silent serial films
American black-and-white films
Universal Pictures film serials
Lost American films
Films directed by Burton L. King
Silent American drama films
Films set in Egypt
Lost drama films
1910s American films